This is a list of towns in New Zealand. The term "town" has no current statutory meaning in New Zealand, the few "Town Districts" having been abolished in 1989 or earlier. 

The list includes most urban areas in New Zealand. Those deemed urban areas by Statistics New Zealand (under either the NZSCA92 or SSGA18 standard) are marked with an asterisk. Isolated towns, such as Ashburton and Levin, are usually parts of a local government "District" (which occasionally has the same name), but the rest, such as Wainuiomata, Pukerua Bay, and Port Chalmers, are within city council boundaries, and are often referred to as suburbs of their respective cities. Many were boroughs during most of the twentieth century, and some earlier.


A
Ahaura
Ahipara
Ahititi
Ahuroa
Aka Aka
Akaroa 
Ākitio
Albany  
Albert Town 
Albury
Alexandra*
Allanton 
Amberley*
Anakiwa
Arahiwi
Aramoana
Aranga 
Arapohue
Arrowtown* 
Arundel
Ashburton* 
Ashhurst* 
Ashley
Ātiamuri 
Auckland* 
Auroa
Awanui

B
Baddeleys Beach
Balclutha*
Balfour
Barrhill
Barrytown
Beachlands*
Beaumont
Bell Block
Benhar
Benneydale
Bideford
Blackball
Blenheim*
Bluff*
Brighton*
Brightwater*
Broadwood
Bulls*
Bunnythorpe
Burnt Hill

C
Cambridge*
Campbells Beach
Canvastown
Carterton*
Charlton
Chatton
Cheviot
Christchurch*
Clarksville
Clarkville
Clevedon
Clinton
Clive*
Clyde
Coatesville
Collingwood
Colville
Cooks Beach
Coopers Creek
Coroglen
Coromandel*
Cromwell*
Culverden
Cust

D
Dairy Flat
Dannevirke*
Darfield*
Dargaville*
Dipton
Dobson
Dome Valley
Doyleston
Drury
Dunedin*
Duntroon

E
Eastbourne
Edendale
Edgecumbe*
Egmont Village
Eketāhuna
Eltham*
Ettrick
Eyrewell Forest

F
Fairhall
Fairlie 
Fairfax
Fairview
Featherston*
Feilding*
Fencourt
Fernside
Flaxmere
Flaxton
Fox Glacier
Foxton*
Foxton Beach*
Frankton
Franz Josef

G
Geraldine*
Gisborne*
Glen Massey
Glenorchy
Glentui
Glorit
Gordonton
Gore*
Granity
Greymouth*
Greytown*
Grovetown
Gummies Bush

H
Haast
Hakataramea
Halcombe
Hamilton*
Hampden
Hanmer Springs
Hari Hari
Harrisville
Haruru
Hastings*
Haumoana
Haupiri
Havelock 
Havelock North*
Hāwera*
Helensville*
Henley
Herbert
Herekino
Hikuai
Hikurangi*
Hikutaia
Hinuera
Hokitika*
Honikiwi
Hope*
Horeke
Horotiu
Horsham Downs
Houhora
Howick
Huapai*
Huiakama
Huirangi
Hūkerenui
Hunterville
Huntly*
Hunua
Hurleyville

I
Inangahua Junction
Inglewood*
Invercargill*
Irwell

J
Jack's Point
Jacobs River

K
Kaeo
Kaiapoi*
Kaihu
Kaikohe*
Kaikōura* 
Kaimata
Kaingaroa, Northland
Kaingaroa, Bay of Plenty
Kaipara Flats
Kairaki
Kaitaia*
Kaitangata
Kaiwaka
Kakanui
Kakaramea
Kaniere
Kapiro
Kaponga
Karamea 
Karetu
Karitane
Katikati*
Kauaeranga
Kaukapakapa
Kauri
Kawakawa*
Kawerau*
Kekerengu
Kennedy Bay
Kerikeri*
Kihikihi
Kingston
Kinloch
Kiripaka
Kirwee
Kohukohu
Koitiata
Kokatahi
Kokopu
Koromiko
Kumara
Kumeū*
Kurow

L
Lake Hāwea
Lake Tekapo
Langs Beach
Lauriston
Lawrence
Leeston*
Leigh
Lepperton
Levin*
Lincoln*
Linkwater
Little River 
Loburn
Lower Hutt*
Luggate
Lumsden
Lyttelton*

M
Mahurangi West
Makahu
Mamaku
Manaia, Waikato
Manaia, Taranaki
Manakau
Manapouri
Manawahe
Mangakino
Mangamuka
Mangatangi
Mangatawhiri
Mangatoki
Mangawhai*
Manukau
Manurewa
Manutahi
Māpua*
Maraetai*
Mārahau
Marco
Maromaku
Marsden Bay*
Martinborough*
Marton*
Maruia
Masterton*
Matakana
Matakohe
Matamata*
Matapu
Matarangi
Matarau
Matatā
Mataura*
Matihetihe
Maungakaramea
Maungatapere
Maungaturoto
Mayfield
Medlands Beach
Meremere
Methven*
Middlemarch 
Midhirst
Millers Flat
Milton*
Mimi
Minginui
Moana
Moawhango
Moenui
Moeraki
Moerewa*
Mokau
Mokoia
Morrinsville*
Mosgiel*
Mossburn
Motatau
Motueka* 
Motuoapa
Mount Maunganui
Mount Somers
Murchison 
Murupara*

N
Napier*
Naseby
National Park
Nelson* 
New Brighton
New Plymouth*
Ngaere
Ngākuta Bay
Ngamatapouri
Ngapara
Ngāruawāhia*
Ngataki
Ngatea*
Ngongotahā*
Ngongotahā Valley
Ngunguru*
Nightcaps
Norfolk
Normanby
Norsewood

O
Ōakura*
Oamaru*
Oban
Ōhaeawai
Ohakune*
Ohangai
Ōhaupō
Ohoka
Ōhope*
Ōhura
Ōkaihau
Ōkato
Ōkiwi Bay
Okuku
Omaha
Omanaia
Omarama
Omata
Ōmokoroa*
Onewhero
Opononi
Ōpōtiki*
Opua*
Ōpunake*
Oratia
Orewa
Oromahoe
Oruaiti
Otaika
Ōtaki*
Otakou
Otautau
Otematata
Otiria
Ōtorohanga*
Ōwhango
Owaka
Oxford*

P
Paekākāriki*
Paeroa*
Pahiatua*
Paihia*
Pakaraka
Pakiri
Pakotai
Palmerston 
Palmerston North*
Pamapuria
Panguru
Papakura
Papamoa
Paparoa
Paparore
Papatoetoe
Parakai
Paraparaumu*
Paremoremo
Pareora
Parewanui
Paroa
Parua Bay
Patea*
Patumahoe*
Pauanui
Pāuatahanui
Pegasus*
Peka Peka
Pembroke
Peria
Petone
Picton*
Piopio
Pipiwai
Pirinoa
Pirongia
Pleasant Point*
Plimmerton
Plummers Point
Point Wells
Pōkeno
Porirua*
Poroti
Port Chalmers
Portland
Portobello 
Puhoi
Pukekohe*
Pukepoto
Pukerimu
Pukerua Bay
Puketona
Pukeuri
Punakaiki
Purua
Putāruru*
Putorino

Q
Queenstown*

R
Raetihi*
Raglan*
Rahotu
Rai Valley
Rainbows End
Rakaia*
Ramarama
Ranfurly
Rangiora*
Rapaura
Rārangi
Ratapiko
Raumati Beach
Raumati South
Rawene
Rawhitiroa
Reefton* 
Renwick* 
Reporoa
Richmond*
Riverhead*
Riverlands
Riversdale
Riversdale Beach
Riverton / Aparima*
Riwaka
Rolleston* 
Ross
Rotorua*
Roxburgh
Ruakākā
Ruatoria
Ruawai
Runanga*
Russell

S

Saint Andrews
Saint Arnaud
Saint Bathans
Sanson
Seacliff
Seddon
Seddonville
Sefton
Shannon*
Sheffield
Shelly Beach
Silverdale
Snells Beach*
Spring Creek
Springfield
Springston
Stirling
Stratford*
Swannanoa

T
Taharoa
Taieri Mouth
Taihape*
Taipa-Mangonui*
Tairua*
Tākaka*
Tangiteroria
Tangowahine
Tapanui
Tapawera
Tapora
Tapu
Taradale
Tauhoa
Taumarunui*
Taupaki
Taupō*
Tauranga*
Tauraroa
Tautoro
Te Anau* 
Te Arai
Te Aroha*
Te Awamutu*
Te Awanga
Te Hana
Te Hāpua
Te Horo
Te Kao
Te Kauwhata*
Te Kōpuru
Te Kūiti*
Te Poi
Te Puke*
Te Puna West
Te Puru
Te Rahu
Te Rerenga
Temuka*
Thames*
Thornton Bay
Ti Point
Tikorangi
Timaru*
Tinopai
Tinwald 
Tīrau
Titoki
Tokanui, Southland
Tokanui, Waikato
Tokarahi
Toko
Tokomaru
Tokoroa*
Tolaga Bay
Tomarata
Towai
Tryphena
Tuahiwi
Tuai
Tuakau*
Tuamarina
Tuatapere
Tūrangi*
Turua
Twizel*

U
Umawera
Upper Hutt*
Upper Moutere
Urenui
Uruti

W
Waddington
Waharoa
Waiau
Waiau Pa
Waiharara
Waiheke Island*
Waihi*
Waihi Beach*
Waihola
Waikaia
Waikaka
Waikanae*
Waikawa, Marlborough
Waikawa, Southland
Waikouaiti*
Waikuku
Waikuku Beach
Waimā
Waimangaroa
Waimate*
Waimate North
Waimauku
Wainui
Wainuiomata
Waiomu
Waioneke
Waiotira
Waiouru*
Waipango
Waipawa*
Waipu*
Waipu Cove
Waipukurau*
Wairakei
Wairau Valley
Wairio
Wairoa*
Waitahuna
Waitara*
Waitaria Bay
Waitati
Waitoa
Waitoki
Waitomo
Waitoriki
Waitōtara
Waiuku*
Waiwera
Wakefield*
Wallacetown
Walton 
Wānaka*
Ward
Wardville
Warkworth*
Warrington
Waverley
Wellington*
Wellsford*
Weston 
Westport*
Whakamaru
Whakatāne*
Whananaki
Whangamatā*
Whangamōmona
Whanganui*
Whangaparāoa*
Whangārei*
Whangārei Heads
Whangaruru
Whangateau
Whataroa
Whatuwhiwhi
Whenuakite
Whenuakura
Whiritoa
Whitby
Whitford
Whitianga*
Willowby
Wimbledon
Winchester
Windsor
Windwhistle
Winscombe
Winton*
Woodbourne
Woodend*
Woodend Beach
Woodhill
Woodville*
Wyndham

See also
Statistics New Zealand
Regions of New Zealand
CommunityNet Aotearoa
 List of cities in New Zealand
List of villages and neighbourhoods in the Cook Islands
List of villages in Niue
List of villages in Tokelau

References

External links
New Zealand sign language for place names
 Towns
Towns